The 2022 Shimadzu All Japan Indoor Tennis Championships was a professional tennis tournament played on outdoor hard courts. It was the third edition of the tournament which was part of the 2022 ITF Women's World Tennis Tour. It took place in Kyoto, Japan between 19 and 25 December 2022.

Champions

Singles

  Miyu Kato def.  Yuriko Miyazaki, 6–4, 2–6, 6–2

Doubles

  Liang En-shuo /  Wu Fang-hsien def.  Momoko Kobori /  Luksika Kumkhum, 2–6, 7–6(7–5), [10–2]

Singles main draw entrants

Seeds

 1 Rankings are as of 12 December 2022.

Other entrants
The following players received wildcards into the singles main draw:
  Rinko Matsuda
  Anri Nagata
  Akiko Omae

The following player received entry into the singles main draw using a protected ranking:
  Ayano Shimizu

The following players received entry from the qualifying draw:
  Miyu Kato
  Ari Matsumoto
  Suzuho Oshino
  Michika Ozeki
  Sara Saito
  Ramu Ueda

References

External links
 2022 Shimadzu All Japan Indoor Tennis Championships at ITFtennis.com
 Official website

All Japan Indoor Tennis Championships
2022 ITF Women's World Tennis Tour
2022 in Japanese tennis
December 2022 sports events in Japan